Camellia Institute of Technology, or (CIT), is a private engineering college located in Kolkata, India. It was founded in 2007 by "Camellia Educational and Manpower Development Trust". The institute is affiliated to West Bengal University of Technology and all courses are approved by AICTE.

References

External links 
 

Engineering colleges in Kolkata
Colleges affiliated to West Bengal University of Technology
Educational institutions established in 2007
2007 establishments in West Bengal